

1992 Winter Olympics

1994 Winter Olympics

1998 Winter Olympics

References

External links
InBaseline
The 1992 Winter Olympics (TNT) 
The 1994 Winter Olympics (TNT) 
The 1998 Winter Olympics (TNT)

Turner Sports
TNT